Mateus Henrique Fonseca Lopes (born 7 December 1975, in São Vicente), known simply as Mateus, is a Cape Verdean footballer who plays as a striker. He also holds a Portuguese passport, due to the many years he spent in the country.

External links

1975 births
Living people
People from São Vicente, Cape Verde
Portuguese people of Cape Verdean descent
Cape Verdean footballers
Association football forwards
Primeira Liga players
Liga Portugal 2 players
Segunda Divisão players
G.D. Gafanha players
U.D. Oliveirense players
F.C. Vizela players
F.C. Felgueiras players
A.D. Ovarense players
F.C. Marco players
G.D. Chaves players
Portimonense S.C. players
C.D. Santa Clara players
S.C. Beira-Mar players
Rio Ave F.C. players
S.C. Farense players
C.D.R. Quarteirense players
A.C. Alcanenense players
S.R. Almancilense players
U.S.C. Paredes players
F.C. Maia players
Allsvenskan players
Assyriska FF players
Girabola players
Atlético Petróleos de Luanda players
Cypriot First Division players
Cypriot Second Division players
Doxa Katokopias FC players
Ayia Napa FC players
Ethnikos Assia FC players
Omonia Aradippou players
Cape Verde international footballers
Cape Verdean expatriate footballers
Expatriate footballers in Portugal
Expatriate footballers in Sweden
Expatriate footballers in Angola
Expatriate footballers in Cyprus
Cape Verdean expatriate sportspeople in Portugal
Cape Verdean expatriate sportspeople in Sweden
Cape Verdean expatriate sportspeople in Angola
Cape Verdean expatriate sportspeople in Cyprus